General elections were held in Venezuela on 30 July 2000, the first under the country's newly adopted 1999 constitution. Incumbent President Hugo Chávez ran for election for a full 6-year term under the new Constitution. He was challenged by another leftist, a former ally of his, Zulia Governor Francisco Arias Cárdenas. Chávez won the election with almost 60% of the popular vote, increasing his vote share over the previous elections, and managing to carry a larger number of states. Arias Cárdenas only managed to narrowly carry his home state of Zulia.

Electoral system
Representatives in the National Assembly were elected under a mixed member proportional representation, with 60% elected in single seat districts and the remainder by closed party lists.

Results

President

National Assembly

References

Bolivarian Revolution
Elections in Venezuela
Venezuela
2000 in Venezuela
Presidential elections in Venezuela
Election